Antonio Manuel Reina Ballesteros (born 13 June 1981 in Osuna, Seville) is a Spanish middle distance runner. He specializes in the 800 metres.

Competition record

Personal bests
400 metres - 45.98 s (2005)
800 metres - 1:43.83 min (2002)
1500 metres - 4:09.08 min (1998)

References
 
 

1981 births
Living people
Spanish male middle-distance runners
Athletes (track and field) at the 2004 Summer Olympics
Athletes (track and field) at the 2008 Summer Olympics
Athletes (track and field) at the 2012 Summer Olympics
Olympic athletes of Spain
Mediterranean Games gold medalists for Spain
Mediterranean Games medalists in athletics
Athletes (track and field) at the 2001 Mediterranean Games
Athletes (track and field) at the 2005 Mediterranean Games
People from Osuna
Sportspeople from the Province of Seville
21st-century Spanish people